Vojkovići may refer to:

Bosnia and Herzegovina 

 Vojkovići, Istočno Sarajevo
 Vojkovići, Tomislavgrad

Montenegro